Mountain Ridge High School is a high school in Frostburg, Maryland, United States, that houses over 1000 students from the Georges Creek Valley, the Greater Frostburg vicinity, and the Westernport region.  Mountain Ridge is part of Allegany County Public Schools. The school mascot is a miner and the school colors are red, black, white and gold.

History
Mountain Ridge High School was established as a result of the consolidation of Westmar High School and Beall High School. It cost $40 million to build. The doors of Mountain Ridge opened in 2007.

Westmar High School
Westmar High School was located in Lonaconing, Maryland, and enrolled more than 400 from the Georges Creek Valley, Westernport, and the region surrounding U.S. Route 220 between Danville and McCoole. The school mascot was the Wildcat and its colors were red and gray.  Westmar came into being with the consolidation of Valley High School (of Lonaconing) and Bruce High School (of Westernport). Bruce closed in 1986, its students transferring to Valley High School. Bruce became a middle school.  During the 1989-1990 school year, controversy erupted surrounding the school's name which remained the same following the consolidation, and a new name, Westmar High School, was chosen to better signify a unified Valley and Bruce in late 1989. Subsequently, Bruce Middle became Westmar Middle. In the fall of 2007, Westmar Middle relocated from its Westernport location to the Westmar High School building in Lonaconing following the closure of Westmar High earlier in 2007.

Valley High School
Valley High School was established in 1953 as a result of the consolidation of Central High School  (of Lonaconing) and Barton High School.  Central was located next to the Iron Furnace in Lonaconing. Its doors opened in the fall of 1896 and was the first official high school of the Lonaconing area. Barton High School was located on Latrobe St. The mascot was the Black Knight, and the school colors were black and silver.

Bruce High School
Bruce High School was the first official high school in Westernport. Bruce High opened in 1893 and closed 1986. It was first located on Hammond Street prior to 1900, then moved to Church Street where Westernport Elementary School is now.  In 1957, Bruce moved to a new location on Philos Avenue. In 1986, Bruce High closed and the building became the new Bruce Middle School.  In 1989, Bruce Middle became Westmar Middle.  In 2007, Westmar Middle relocated to Lonaconing, vacating the former Bruce building.  Bruce was named after Oliver Herman Bruce, principal of Westernport schools from 1875 until 1920.
The school colors were Blue & White and the mascot was the Bulldog.

Beall High School

Beall High School was established in the mid-1890s as the first high school of Frostburg.  The first Beall High School was located at the corner of Loo Street (now College Avenue) and Broadway, where Beall Elementary School stands today.  The first graduating class consisted of six female graduates in 1897.  The original building was renovated in 1910, and expanded in 1930.  By the late 1930s, the Frostburg community was in dire need of a much larger, newer facility.  In 1939, ground was broken for a new Beall High School, located at 331 E. Main Street, in an area locally known as the "Eckhart Flat."  The newer building is the one that most graduates and citizens of Frostburg are familiar with.  It was considered an architectural wonder of its time with its Art Deco styling.

In 2000, Beall consolidated with Mount Savage High School which is currently occupied by Mount Savage (K-8) School.  The elementary school section of Mount Savage (K-5) houses students from the Mt. Savage region only. The middle school section (6-8) houses students from both Frostburg and Mt. Savage (all students living in the former Beall High school district).  In 2007, Beall High School closed and the student body consolidated with that of Westmar High into the newly built Mountain Ridge High School, constructed at the site of the former Beall High School Stadium.  In the fall of 2007, Beall was demolished in order to make way for athletic fields for Mountain Ridge.

The school mascot was the Mountaineer and the school colors were blue and gold.

Athletics

Fall Sports
Football, Boys' Soccer, Girls' Soccer, Cross Country, Golf, Unified Tennis, Volleyball

Winter Sports
Boys' Basketball, Girls' Basketball, Wrestling, Bowling, Unified Bocce Ball

Spring Sports
Baseball, Softball, Track & Field, Tennis, Unified Track

References

External links
ACPS Mountain Ridge 

 Mountain Ridge Official Website   

Frostburg, Maryland
Public high schools in Maryland
Schools in Allegany County, Maryland
2007 establishments in Maryland
Educational institutions established in 2007